Oak Ridge is an unincorporated community located along the border of West Milford Township in Passaic County and Jefferson Township in Morris County, New Jersey, United States. The area is served as United States Postal Service ZIP Code 07438.

As of the 2000 United States Census, the population for ZIP Code Tabulation Area 07438 was 11,901.

Oak Ridge is located on the Pequannock River along NJ Route 23 and the New York, Susquehanna & Western Railroad main line. County Route 699 (Oak Ridge Road) runs south from the junction with NJ 23 and is the main north–south local route in the community.

Demographics

Climate
This climatic region is typified by large seasonal temperature differences, with warm to hot (and often humid) summers and cold (sometimes severely cold) winters.  According to the Köppen Climate Classification system, Oak Ridge has a humid continental climate, abbreviated "Dfb" on climate maps.

References

External links

 Census 2000 Fact Sheet for Zip Code Tabulation Area 07438 from the United States Census Bureau
 The Advertiser-News (local area newspaper)

Jefferson Township, New Jersey
West Milford, New Jersey
Unincorporated communities in Morris County, New Jersey
Unincorporated communities in Passaic County, New Jersey
Unincorporated communities in New Jersey